Sailing at the 2010 Asian Games was held in Shanwei Water Sports Center, Shanwei, China from 14 to 20 November 2010.

Schedule

Medalists

Men

Women

Open

Medal table

Participating nations
A total of 167 athletes from 17 nations competed in sailing at the 2010 Asian Games:

References

External links
 

 
2010
2010 Asian Games events
Asian Games
Sailing competitions in China